Poland national team may refer to the following:

Men:
Poland national American football team
Poland men's national basketball team
Poland men's national 3x3 team
Poland national football team
Poland national under-21 football team
Poland men's national handball team
Poland national rugby union team
Poland speedway team
Poland men's national volleyball team
Poland Davis Cup team
Women:
Poland women's national football team
Poland women's national handball team
Poland women's national volleyball team
Poland Billie Jean King Cup team